Ermoupoli, also known by the formal older name Ermoupolis or Hermoupolis ( <  "Town of Hermes"), is a town and former municipality on the island of Syros, in the Cyclades, Greece. Since the 2011 local government reform, it is part of the municipality Syros-Ermoupoli, of which it is the seat and a municipal unit. It is also the capital of the South Aegean region. The municipal unit has an area of 11.181 km2.

History
Ermoupoli was founded during the Greek Revolution in the 1820s, as an extension to the existing Ano Syros township, by refugees from other Greek islands because of the War. It soon became the leading commercial and industrial center of Greece, as well as its main port. The renowned Greek Steamship Company was founded in the city in 1856. Thousands of ships were built in the various Syros shipyards.

Eventually Ermoupoli was eclipsed by Piraeus in the late 19th century. In the following decades the city declined, remaining the administrative center of the Cyclades islands. In the end of the 20th and the beginning of the 21st century, its economy has significanty improved, based on the sectrors of services, industry, education and tourism.

Geography

Climate

Notable people
Emmanouil Benakis (1843–1929), merchant and politician
Olga Broumas (1949), poet and translator
Manos Eleutheriou, lyricist
Stelios Mainas (1957), actor
Michael Melas, father of Pavlos Melas, fighter of the Greek Struggle for Macedonia
Emmanuel Rhoides (1836–1904), writer and journalist
Georgios Souris, poet
Markos Vamvakaris (1905–1972), rebetiko musician
Demetrius Vikelas (1835–1908), businessman, writer and the first president of the International Olympic Committee

Gallery

References

External links

Official website of Ermoupoli 
University of the Aegean in Ermoupoli

Greek prefectural capitals
Greek regional capitals
Populated places in Syros
Populated places established in the 1820s